was a Japanese entrepreneur, cabinet minister and diplomat before, during and after World War II.

Biography
Murata was a native of Tokyo and a graduated the Tokyo Higher Commerce School (now Hitotsubashi University) in 1900. There he was friends with Shinji Tazaki, a commerce scholar who was awarded Senior Third Rank, the First Order of Merit. After graduation, he went to work with the Osaka Shosen Kaisha (currently Mitsui O.S.K. Lines), and transformed the relatively small company into a major shipping company. He was sent to the company’s branch in Shanghai in 1901 at the age of 24. and eventually rose to the position of company president from 1934-1940.

In 1939, Murata was appointed to the House of Peers in the Diet of Japan. Murata was representative of successful private entrepreneurs who were invited to join the Taisei Yokusankai political organization created by Fumimaro Konoe and his followers, and took active participation in debate on the state socialist controlled economy created under the National Mobilization Law.

Murata was invited to become both Minister of Communications and Minister of Railways under the 3rd and 4th Konoe administrations from 1940. In 1943, Murata became Japanese ambassador to the Second Philippine Republic, and special advisor to the Japanese Fourteenth Area Army of the Imperial Japanese Army. As ambassador he brought a team of scholars from Japan to make a research report with recommendations for the collaborationist government, told President José Laurel that the Philippines had the right to make more demands upon the Japanese government; however, his report and efforts were ignored by the Japanese military. He was recalled to Japan in 1945.

In 1946, along with all members of the wartime Japanese government, Murata was purged from public office and was taken into custody by the American occupation authorities and held at Sugamo Prison, where he was to be charged for war crimes. However, he was released without ever being formally charged.

In 1951, Murata became a special advisor to the Foreign Ministry. He also appointed special ambassador to the Philippines in 1954, and worked towards normalization of relations and settlement of war-time compensation claims.  In the post-war period, Murata was president of the Japan Association for the Promotion of International Trade (JAPIT), and a number of other charity associations. He also worked towards the restoration of diplomatic relations between China and Japan, visiting Beijing in 1952, and meeting with Zhou Enlai in 1955 in China and signing a trade agreement.

References

External links

Biography at National Diet Library

Notes

1878 births
1957 deaths
Japanese businesspeople
Members of the House of Peers (Japan)
Government ministers of Japan
Japanese people of World War II
Hitotsubashi University alumni
Businesspeople from Tokyo
Imperial Rule Assistance Association politicians
20th-century Japanese politicians
Japanese expatriates in the Philippines
Philippines in World War II
Ambassadors of Japan to the Philippines